Lim Khim Katy (born 1978) is a contemporary Vietnamese artist. She is known for her paintings.

Biography 
Lim Khim Katy was born in 1978 in Ho Chi Minh City, Vietnam, to a Chinese Cambodian father and a Vietnamese mother. She graduated from Ho Chi Minh City Fine Arts University in 2001. Her paintings often focus on middle class or poor Vietnamese people going through troubling times in their lives.

Exhibitions and awards 

2001
 Certificate of merit at Vietnam National Fine Arts Exhibition for the painting "Naptime"
 Certificate of merit at Asia Pacific Contemporary Fine Arts Exhibition organized by Philip Morris for the painting "The Power of Numbers"
 Certificate of merit of section 6 exhibition for the painting "Silence"
2003
 Award from the Vietnam Literary and Artistry Association at Section 6 Exhibition for the painting "Empty Bowls"
2004
 Third prize of Young's Eyes Exhibition organized by the Consulate General of France and the Vietnam Literary and Artistry Association for the painting "Empty Bowls"
 Consultation prize at Vietnam ethnic minority artists exhibition organized by the Fine Arts Association for the painting "Everyone has his own dream"
2005
 Solo Exhibition in Hanoi, Vietnam
 Certificate of merit at Vietnam National Fine Arts Exhibition for the painting "Black Sea"
 Award from the Vietnam Association at Section 6 Exhibition for the painting "Asian Woman"
 International Exhibition in Museum Vietnam for the painting "Thinking of Another People"
2006
 Solo Exhibition "Symphony of Thoughts" at La Lanta Fine Arts in Bangkok, Thailand

See also 
 List of Vietnamese women artists

References

Sources
Biography from La Lanta Fine Art

1978 births
Living people
Vietnamese people of Chinese descent
Vietnamese people of Cambodian descent
People from Ho Chi Minh City
21st-century Vietnamese painters
Vietnamese women artists
21st-century Vietnamese women